Strattis biguttatus, is a species of weevil found in Indian subcontinent.

Description
Body ovate. Scutellum bare. Elytra with small glossy tubercles located along median suture. Mesosternal receptacle is transverse. Procoxae and mesocoxae are almost contiguous. Femora edentate, and sulcate ventrally, with bare sulci. Femora clavate. Abdomino-femoral stridulatory structure is present where the stridulatory files are present on the inner lateral aspect of meta-femora. In female, the eighth sternite is pouch shaped.

References 

Curculionidae
Insects of Sri Lanka
Beetles described in 1883